Peter Seaman may refer to:

 Jeffrey Price and Peter S. Seaman
 Peter Seaman (Mayor of Norwich)